Wabamun Generating Station was a coal-fired power station owned by TransAlta, located next to the village of Wabamun, Alberta.  The station's primary source of fuel was sub bituminous from the Whitewood mine.  Unit 3 was retired in 2002; Units 1 and 2 on December 31, 2004, and Unit 4 on March 31, 2010. On August 11, 2011, the main building was levelled by a controlled implosion. Plans for the site include high rise condos and a waterfront.

Description
The plant consisted of:
 Unit 1 from  Babcock & Wilcox at 66 MW (commissioned in 1958, decommissioned in 2004)
 Unit 2 from  Babcock & Wilcox at 66 MW (commissioned in 1956, decommissioned in 2004)
 Unit 3 from Combustion Engineering at 150 (commissioned in 1962, decommissioned in 2002)
 Unit 4 from  Combustion Engineering at 300 (commissioned in 1968, decommissioned in 2010)

Decommissioned in 2010 with the smoke stacks demolished in March 2011.

References

Coal-fired power stations in Alberta
Demolished buildings and structures in Alberta
Demolished power stations
Former coal-fired power stations in Canada
Energy infrastructure completed in 1956
Energy infrastructure completed in 1958
Energy infrastructure completed in 1962
Energy infrastructure completed in 1968
Buildings and structures demolished by controlled implosion
Buildings and structures demolished in 2011